Schizothecium inaequale is a species of coprophilous fungus in the family Lasiosphaeriaceae. It is known to grow in the dung of goats.

References

External links

Fungi described in 1972
Fungi of Greece
Sordariales